A "Berkshire" type steam locomotive refers to a steam locomotive built with a 2-8-4 wheel configuration. The design was initially intended to improve on the USRA Mikado design (2-8-2), which was deemed to lack sufficient speed and horsepower. That was overcome by the inclusion of a larger,  firebox, requiring an extra trailing axle, giving the locomotive its distinctive 2-8-4 wheel arrangement.    

The name of "Berkshire" was chosen for the 2-8-4 type based on the Lima Locomotive Works testing on the Berkshire Hills of the Boston & Albany Railroad. After the Class A-1 successfully outperformed a Class H-10 Mikado, the Boston & Albany Railroad became the first to order the new Berkshires. Over 600 were built by the Lima Locomotive Works, the American Locomotive Company, and Baldwin Locomotive Works. A total of nineteen different railroads purchased Berkshires, including the Erie Railroad, who owned 105 Berkshires, more than any other railroad; the Chesapeake & Ohio Railway, who nicknamed theirs the Kanawhas; and the Louisville & Nashville Railroad's, whose locomotives were technically designated as Class M-1 but were referred to as "Big Emmas".

Only two "Berkshire" type steam locomotives are in operating condition today: Pere Marquette 1225 and Nickel Plate 765.

See also
 Van Sweringen brothers
 2-8-2

External links
American Rails article on Berkshires
Steam Locomotive article on Berkshires

Lima locomotives
Freight locomotives